Nile TV International is a public Egyptian television channel. It is the second Egyptian satellite television news network in Egypt, and the first Arab satellite channel to broadcast its programs in foreign languages; English, French, and formerly Hebrew.

Nile TV International is broadcast on four satellites, allowing for its transmission to reach the whole Arab world, the Middle East, Europe, and the United States. Moreover, it is also broadcast as a terrestrial channel on the UHF band.

In July 2009, Nile TV International became formally part of the News Center of the Egyptian Radio and Television Union (ERTU), headed by Abdel-Latif el-Menawy.

Hebrew service
There used to be a two-hour daily Hebrew service. The broadcast could be viewed outside of Egyptian borders from 6:00 PM CAT to 8:00 PM CAT, and aimed to represent a pan-Arab view.

Administration
The channel's current president is Sameh Ragaee, who was previously the president of the Al-Nile Al-Akhbar (Nile News) Channel. He took the post in 2014. The former president, Dr. Mervat Mohsen, had to resign because of a mistake caused by the shift supervisor, who broadcast a documentary on former Egyptian president Mohamed Morsi.

Former presidents
 
 Hassan Hamed
 Halla Hashish
 Dr. Mervat Mohsen
 Nashwa Shalakany
 Mervat el-Kaffas
 
 Youssef Sherif Rizkallah

Anchors and reporters

Current English anchors
Nermin Nazim
Hend Farrag
Nesreen Bahaa El-Din
Yasser Abdel Hakim
Radwa Mobarak
Hany Seif
Mahetab El-Afandi
Mayssa Maher
Mohamed Abdel Rehim
Ibrahim Kabeel
Dina Hussein
Hala El-Hamalawy
Mona Sweilam
Nancy Sarah Barakat
Yasmin Bakir

Current English reporters
Mona Moselhy
Angy Maher
Nermine Abdel Rahman
Sally Lamloum
Amira Mohsen
Aya El-Batrawy
Yasmine Ibrahim
Karim Gamal El-Din

Former English anchors
Bassel Sabri
Nihal Saad
Sami Zidan
Ayman Salah
Ahmed El-Naggar
Shahira Amin
Yousef Gamal El-Din

Shows
Panorama News
Mondays
Front Line
Open to Question
Arab Affairs
Business World
Nile Cruise
Cairo Watch
Egypt Today

In Ramadan 2009, the channel embarked on a daily two-hour talk show which aired from downtown Azhar park. "Egyptian Nights" aired 30 episodes and included several high-profile guests and extensive reporting.

References

External links

 ERTU

1994 establishments in Egypt
Television stations in Egypt
Arabic-language television stations
International broadcasters
Television channels and stations established in 1994
Government-owned companies of Egypt
State media
Mass media in Cairo
Multilingual news services